The Ambassador of Australia to Mexico is an officer of the Australian Department of Foreign Affairs and Trade and the head of the Embassy of the Commonwealth of Australia to the United Mexican States. Mexico and Australia established diplomatic relations on 14 March 1966. The Australian Government opened the Australian Embassy in Mexico City in 1967 in an effort to strengthen its contacts with Latin America. 

The current ambassador, since February 2020, is Remo Moretta.

List of ambassadors

See also
 Australia–Mexico relations

References

 
Mexico
Australia